Roberto Armando Albores Gleason (born 16 February 1979) is a Mexican politician affiliated with the PRI. He currently serves as Senator of the LXII Legislature of the Mexican Congress representing Chiapas. He also served as members of the Chamber of Deputies during the LXI Legislature.

References

1979 births
Living people
Politicians from Chiapas
Institutional Revolutionary Party politicians
Members of the Chamber of Deputies (Mexico)
Members of the Senate of the Republic (Mexico)
21st-century Mexican politicians
Instituto Tecnológico Autónomo de México alumni
Deputies of the LXI Legislature of Mexico
Senators of the LXII and LXIII Legislatures of Mexico